Grays Knob is an unincorporated community and coal town in Harlan County, Kentucky, United States.

A post office was established in the community in 1916, and named for a local hill. It is located just south of the city of Harlan.

References

Unincorporated communities in Harlan County, Kentucky
Unincorporated communities in Kentucky
Coal towns in Kentucky